Naale Njangalude Vivaham (Tomorrow is our marriage) is a 1986 Indian Malayalam film, directed by Sajan. The film stars Shankar, Ahalya, Shafeeq, Mukesh and Menaka in the lead roles. The film has musical score by Shyam.

Cast

Shankar as Haridas
Ahalya as Mini
Shafeeq as Dileep
Menaka as Indu
Mukesh as Unni
Jalaja as Vimala
Sukumari as Saraswathiyamma, Haridas's mother
Innocent as Pandit Keralaraja Gangadara Munshi
V. D. Rajappan as Nalinakshan 
Baiju as Nanappan
Tony as Ramesh, Dileep's friend
Prathapachandran as Divakaran Menon
Kalpana as Mini's friend
Lalithasree as Superintendent Devayani 
Mala Aravindan as Mathachan
Poojappura Ravi as Peon Pilla
Valsala Menon as Padmavathi, Mini's mother
Kollam Shah as Dileep's friend
Vishnu Prakash B. as man at supply office

Soundtrack
The music was composed by Shyam and the lyrics were written by Chunakkara Ramankutty.

References

External links
 

1986 films
1980s Malayalam-language films